MANSAM or Women of Sudanese Civic and Political Groups (also: Sudan's Women, Political and Civil Groups) is an alliance of eight political women's groups, 18 civil society organisations, two youth groups and individuals in Sudan that was active in the Sudanese Revolution.

Sudanese Revolution
MANSAM was one of the signers of the 1 January declaration that created the Forces of Freedom and Change (FFC), the main broad alliance of organisations, networks and political parties that played a dominating coordinating role in the Sudanese Revolution starting in December 2018.

On 2 July 2019, during negotiations between the Transitional Military Council (TMC) and the FFC on behalf of civilian groups, MANSAM stated that women had been excluded from the negotiations, despite women's prominent role in the protests and MANSAM being a member of the FFC. According to Alaa Salah speaking as a member of MANSAM at the 8649th meeting of the United Nations Security Council (UNSC), on 29 October 2019, after "strong advocacy by women's groups", one woman participated in the negotiations.

On 16 August 2019, MANSAM objected to the "poor representation of women" in proposed memberships of the Sovereignty Council and the transitionary cabinet of ministers, and called for "a minimum of 50% women in leadership roles in government". MANSAM stated that it had provided the FFC leadership with "high [calibre] nominations, in collaboration with the relevant professional associations, only to be faced with a final list that does not include any of our nominations, without further discussion or consultation." MANSAM called women's organisations, women politicians and allies to "raise their voice" in supporting equal representation for women.

Alaa Salah's speech at UNSC 
As a member of MANSAM, which is one of the major Sudanese women's networks that signed the 1 January 2019 Forces of Freedom and Change declaration, Alaa Salah gave a speech at the 29 October 2019 meeting of the United Nations Security Council (UNSC).

Salah stated that despite women often having constituted 70% of protestors, they were "side-lined in the formal political process" of creating transitional institutions. She stated that women's representation in the new governance structure "[fell] far below [their] demand of 50% parity". She argued that "there is no excuse for [women] not to have an equal seat at every single table". She summarised her argument for women's representation stating,

Salah also called for judicial accountability and disarmament; and for the political process to be inclusive of women, "civil society, resistance groups, ethnic and religious minorities, those who have been displaced, and people with disabilities to lead to sustainable peace".

See also
Sudanese Women's Union
No to Oppression against Women Initiative

References

Feminist organisations in Sudan
MANSAM
Sudanese democracy movements